Șimnicu may refer to one of two places in Dolj County, Romania:

Șimnicu de Jos, a village in Craiova city
Șimnicu de Sus, a commune